David Foucault (born February 7, 1989) is a Canadian football offensive lineman for the Edmonton Elks of the Canadian Football League (CFL). He played Canadian Interuniversity Sport (CIS) football for the Montreal Carabins. He has also played for the Carolina Panthers of the National Football League (NFL) and the BC Lions and Montreal Alouettes of the CFL.

Professional career
Foucault was selected fifth overall by the Montreal Alouettes (CFL) in the 2014 CFL Draft. Along with Antoine Pruneau, he became one of the first two Montreal Carabins chosen in the first round of the CFL Draft. The Alouettes would continue to hold his player rights until April 2017.

Carolina Panthers

2014 season
Unlike fellow Québécois NFL rookie Laurent Duvernay-Tardif, Foucault was not drafted into the NFL, but he was invited to the Carolina Panthers, the Indianapolis Colts, and the Miami Dolphins rookie camps. He attended the Panthers' camp because the team had fewer offensive linemen competing for positions than the Colts and the Dolphins. The Panthers signed him following the tryout. On August 31, the team announced that Foucault had made the final 53-man roster.

2015 season
On September 5, 2015, Foucault was released by the Panthers. On September 7, 2015, he was signed to the Panthers' practice squad. On October 2, Foucault was called up from the practice squad.

On October 6, he was cut from the team, but signed once again to the practice squad on October 8.

As of January 17, 2016, Foucault was on the Panther's practice squad and was on the sidelines during the Divisional Round playoff game against Seattle.

On February 7, 2016, Foucault's Panthers played in Super Bowl 50. In the game, the Panthers fell to the Denver Broncos by a score of 24–10.

2016 season
On August 28, 2016, Foucault was waived by the Panthers.

BC Lions 
On March 27, 2017, the BC Lions (CFL) acquired the rights to Foucault and offensive lineman Vincent Brown from the Montreal Alouettes in exchange for international offensive lineman Jovan Olafioye and future considerations. On April 11, 2017, the Lions and Foucault agreed to a three-year contract through the 2019 CFL season. He played in 51 regular season games with the Lions and became a free agent after 2019.

Montreal Alouettes 
On February 8, 2021, it was announced that Foucault had signed with the Montreal Alouettes. He played in 13 games for the Alouettes, but was released shortly after the season ended on December 20, 2021.

Edmonton Elks 
Foucault signed with the Edmonton Elks on January 3, 2022. On November 7, 2022, the Edmonton Elks extended Foucault’s contract for 2 years, through the 2024 season.

References

External links 
Edmonton Elks bio
Panthers bio

1989 births
Living people
Canadian football offensive linemen
American football offensive tackles
Canadian players of American football
Montreal Carabins football players
Carolina Panthers players
Players of Canadian football from Quebec
People from LaSalle, Quebec
Canadian football people from Montreal
BC Lions players
Montreal Alouettes players
Edmonton Elks players